Judge Barksdale may refer to:

Alfred D. Barksdale (1892–1972), Virginia state court judge and judge of the United States District Court for the Western District of Virginia
Patricia D. Barksdale (born 1971), magistrate judge for the United States District Court for the Middle District of Florida
Rhesa Barksdale (born 1944), judge of the United States Court of Appeals for the Fifth Circuit